dselect is a computer program used to manage software packages in the Debian operating system.

dselect is one of the oldest front-ends to dpkg, and the bulk of its development happened when it was originally written by Ian Jackson, who wrote it alongside dpkg.

The work on dselect started in dpkg version 0.93.12, and the first alpha release of dselect was made on March 27, 1995 in version 0.93.32. dselect was distributed in the dpkg package until June 21, 2002; even after it was split out into its own package, it was kept as a pre-dependency of dpkg in order to assist upgrades. It has been a standalone package since March 3, 2005.

dselect has a text-mode user interface, a set of key bindings that is generally considered to be fairly non-intuitive, and its dependency resolution mechanism is suboptimal. dselect can now use apt as the back-end 'method' for installing packages.

Today, dselect is largely superseded by Advanced Packaging Tool front-ends.

External links 

 The dselect documentation for beginners

Dpkg